The North Mock Street Historic District encompasses a pair of commercial industrial buildings at 112 and 116 North Mock Street in Prairie Grove, Arkansas.  The B.F. Carl Building, at 116 North Mock, was built in 1904, and originally served as a furniture and casket maker's store. The B.H. Harrison Masonic Temple, at 112 North Mock, was built in 1903, and has served as the home to the local Masonic lodge since.  The two buildings are well-preserved examples of early 20th-century commercial architecture, featuring pressed metal storefronts with Classical features.

The district was listed on the National Register of Historic Places in 2018.

See also
National Register of Historic Places listings in Washington County, Arkansas

References

Historic districts on the National Register of Historic Places in Arkansas
Buildings and structures in Prairie Grove, Arkansas
National Register of Historic Places in Washington County, Arkansas
Commercial buildings completed in 1904
Cultural infrastructure completed in 1903
1903 establishments in Arkansas
1904 establishments in Arkansas
Commercial buildings on the National Register of Historic Places in Arkansas
Clubhouses on the National Register of Historic Places in Arkansas
Masonic buildings in Arkansas